This article chronologically lists the presidents of the Royal and Merciful Society of the Bearer of Medals and Awards of Belgium since 2015.

President of the National Committee 
Presidents of the Royal Society and the National Committee:
Rudy Maes

Presidents of the abroad Regions

Region Germany 
 Benedikt Gellrich

Region France 
 Alain Goudmand

Regional Netherlands 
John Wagemans

Chairman of the Belgian provinces and regions 

Brabant Guy Verdoodt
Bruges Fernand Driessens
Charleroi Myriam Bauval
East Flanders Yves Asselmann
West Flanders Rudy Maes
Hainaut Guy Misson
Kortrijk Nadia Rasson
Liège Roger Jamoul
Limburg Tonny Leten
Mons Bournaige Jean-Michel Spriet
Namur Gérard Gilbert
Tournaisis Christian Masy
Westland Gilbert Vitse

References 

Lists of Belgian people